Doe Avedon (born Dorcas Marie Nowell; April 7, 1925 – December 18, 2011) was an American model and actress.

Early life
Doe Avedon was born Dorcas Marie Nowell in Old Westbury, New York, Long Island on April 7, 1925. Her mother died when she was three years old, after which she was raised by her father who worked as a butler. When Doe was 12 years old her father died; she was raised by the wealthy family for whom her father had worked.

Career
At the age of 19, she began working at a bank in New York City. It was there that she met up and coming photographer Richard Avedon. They were married in 1944 and Avedon set about making his new wife a top model.  He also changed her name from "Dorcas" to "Doe" because he felt her wide set, brown eyes looked like those of a doe. While Avedon appeared in numerous photographs shot by her husband, she did not enjoy modeling and turned to acting in the late 1940s. In 1948, she made her Broadway debut in The Young and Fair. The following year, she cast in My Name Is Aquilon, starring Jean-Pierre Aumont and Arlene Francis. That same year, she made her film debut (under the name "Betty Harper") in the 1949 film noir Jigsaw.

Later that same year, Avedon divorced Richard to marry actor Dan Matthews whom she met while she was performing in the touring production of Mae West's Diamond Lil. She retired from acting shortly thereafter.  In February 1952, Avedon was driving with Matthews from New York City to Los Angeles when their car hit a patch of ice, skidded and overturned. Avedon suffered minor injuries but Matthews was killed. After her husband's death, Avedon returned to acting.

In 1954, she appeared in The High and the Mighty starring John Wayne, followed by a supporting role in the biographical film Deep in My Heart.  From 1955 to 1956, she appeared in the recurring role of Diane Walker on the drama series Big Town. In 1957, Avedon was cast as "Mike McCall", one of the three lead roles in the syndicated sitcom How to Marry a Millionaire, which was based on the 1953 film of the same name that starred Betty Grable, Marilyn Monroe and Lauren Bacall. After filming the pilot episode in the spring of 1957, Avedon's part was recast.

In 1957, Avedon married director Don Siegel. After her marriage, she retired to raise the couple's four children. Avedon and Siegel were divorced in 1975. She briefly returned to acting in 1984 with a role in John Cassavetes' Love Streams.

Death
On December 18, 2011, Avedon died of pneumonia at the Encino Hospital Medical Center in Encino at the age of 86. Her funeral was held on December 22 at Forest Lawn Memorial Park.

In popular culture
The 1957 film Funny Face is based on the story of Doe and Richard Avedon. Audrey Hepburn portrayed "Jo" who is based on Doe while the character of Dick Avery, portrayed by Fred Astaire, is based on Richard Avedon. The film was written by Leonard Gershe who was a friend of the couple.

Broadway

Filmography

References

External links
 
 

1925 births
2011 deaths
20th-century American actresses
Actresses from New York (state)
Female models from New York (state)
American film actresses
American stage actresses
American television actresses
Burials at Forest Lawn Memorial Park (Hollywood Hills)
Deaths from pneumonia in California
People from Greater Los Angeles
People from Old Westbury, New York
21st-century American women